The Floreana giant tortoise (Chelonoidis niger niger), also known as the Charles Island giant tortoise, is an extinct subspecies of the Galápagos tortoise endemic to the Galápagos archipelago in the equatorial eastern Pacific Ocean. The specific epithet niger (‘black’) probably refers to the colouration of the holotype specimen. The species name has often been misspelled as nigra, an error introduced in the 1980s when Chelonoidis was elevated to genus and mistakenly treated as feminine, an error recognized and fixed in 2017.

Taxonomy
This tortoise is a member of Chelonoidis niger, comprising all Galápagos tortoise subspecies, of which it is the nominate form.

Description
Male tortoises grew to about 138 cm and females to 88 cm in length, with strongly saddlebacked carapaces.

Behaviour
The tortoises used to descend to the lower slopes of their volcanic island to graze on new vegetation after wet season rains. They fed on grass, bitterbush and cacti, obtaining water from springs and from cracks in the lava rocks.

Distribution and habitat
The tortoise's natural range was limited to 173 km2 Floreana Island (formerly Charles Island) where it inhabited deciduous and evergreen forests.

Conservation
The tortoise population of Floreana is estimated to have originally comprised some 8,000 individuals. Extinction occurred during the 1840s or 1850s following overexploitation for food by sailors and settlers, as well as predation and habitat degradation from introduced species, including goats, pigs, dogs, cats, donkeys, and rodents. However, several hybrids between this species and Chelonoidis becki were discovered around Wolf Volcano on Isabela Island, apparently from some of the Floreana tortoises being transported there in the early 19th century, and there is an ongoing breeding program which is attempting to resurrect the Floreana subspecies.

References

niger
Subspecies
Turtles of South America
Endemic reptiles of the Galápagos Islands
Reptiles of Ecuador
Taxa named by Jean René Constant Quoy
Taxa named by Joseph Paul Gaimard
Reptiles described in 1824
Extinct turtles
Extinct animals of South America
Reptile extinctions since 1500